Galeyevo (Ğäle) is a rural locality (a village) in Tatlybayevsky Selsoviet, Baymaksky District, Bashkortostan, Russia. The population was 22 as of 2010. There is 1 street.

Geography 
Galeyevo is located 19 km northeast of Baymak (the district's administrative centre) by road. Khasanovo is the nearest rural locality.

References 

Rural localities in Baymaksky District